The Monument to Chocolate, commonly known as Chocolate Fairy, is a monument in the town of Pokrov, Vladimir Oblast, Russia.

A bronze statue was created in 2009 and is known as the first monument to chocolate in the world. The monument is shaped as a chocolate bar, and represents a figure of a magic fairy holding a chocolate in her hands. The monument was unveiled on 1 July 2009, not far from the Pokrov Museum of Chocolate.

The monument was given to the town by Kraft Foods to mark the 15th anniversary of the company's operation in Russia. Kraft Foods' chocolate factory is well known as a producer of chocolate under the brands Alpen Gold, Milka, and Vozdushny, is the backbone enterprise of Pokrov.

Twenty sculptors from the cities of Vladimir and St. Petersburg participated in the competition for the best design of the monument. The project to create the first monument to chocolate was awarded to Ilya Shanin, a talented Vladimir sculptor and winner of the European sand sculptors' championship whose works were displayed in the cities of Germany, Austria and Belgium. It took him a year and a half to complete the sculpture.

A legend associated with the statue says that if one makes a wish and rubs the chocolate tile in the Fairy's hand, his/her life will be sweeter.

References 

2009 establishments in Russia
2009 sculptures
Bronze sculptures in Russia
Buildings and structures in Vladimir Oblast
Chocolate culture
Outdoor sculptures in Russia
Fairies in art
Monuments and memorials in Russia